The Maiden Pap is a hill located in Caithness, Scotland. It is an inselberg, formed of Devonian conglomerates, rising steeply out of the surrounding plain and visible from as far away as Hoy and the Moray Firth. The Pap is so named because its shape resembles that of a human breast.

See also
 Paps of Anu
 Pap of Glencoe  
 Paps of Jura
 Breast-shaped hill

References

External links
Hiking in the Highlands

Caithness
Marilyns of Scotland
Mountains and hills of the Northwest Highlands